Gábor Horváth (born 15 November 1971 in Budapest) is a Hungarian sprint canoeist who competed from 1993 to 2006. Competing in three Summer Olympics, he won three medals in the K-4 1000 m event with two golds (2000, 2004) and one silver (1996).

A member of the Budapest Honvéd FC club, Horváth also had outstanding success at the canoeing World Championships.

Horvath is a member of the Budapest Honvéd FC club.

Awards
Orders and special awards
   Cross of Merit of the Republic of Hungary – Gold Cross (1996)
   Order of Merit of the Republic of Hungary – Officer's Cross (2000)
   Order of Merit of the Republic of Hungary – Commander's Cross (2004)

References
 Kataca.hu profile

External links
 
 

1971 births
Budapest Honvéd FC canoers
Canoeists at the 1996 Summer Olympics
Canoeists at the 2000 Summer Olympics
Canoeists at the 2004 Summer Olympics
Hungarian male canoeists
Living people
Olympic canoeists of Hungary
Olympic gold medalists for Hungary
Olympic silver medalists for Hungary
Canoeists from Budapest
Olympic medalists in canoeing
ICF Canoe Sprint World Championships medalists in kayak
Medalists at the 2004 Summer Olympics
Medalists at the 2000 Summer Olympics
Medalists at the 1996 Summer Olympics
21st-century Hungarian people